Sir John (Guthrie) Ward GCMG  (3 March 1909 - 12 January 1991) was a British diplomat. He was Ambassador to Argentina from 1957 to 1961, and Ambassador to Italy from 1962 to 1966.

References

Ambassadors of the United Kingdom to Argentina
Ambassadors of the United Kingdom to Italy
Knights Grand Cross of the Order of St Michael and St George
1909 births
1991 deaths